Helena Ungler or Unglerowa (died 1551), was a Polish printer. 

She was married to Florian Ungler, the owner and manager of a book printing business in Krakow.  After the death of her husband in 1536, she took over the ownership and management of the printing shop until her own death. This was at the time an unusual profession for a woman, particularly in Poland.   

Works printed during her tenure include: 

 Żołtarz Dawida proroka (1539)
 Poncjan (1540)
 Ludycje wieśne (1543)
 Turcyki Stanisława Orzechowskiego (1543, 1544)
 Historia o żywocie Aleksandra Wielkiego (1550)

See also
 List of women printers and publishers before 1800

References

 Helena Unglerowa . Słownik Polszczyzny XVI w.. [dostęp 2016-03-03].
 Teresa Michałowska: Literatura polskiego średniowiecza . Warszawa: Wydawnictwo Naukowe PWN, 2011.  .

16th-century Polish people
16th-century Polish women
16th-century Polish businesspeople
1551 deaths
16th-century printers
16th-century businesswomen